Bow is an unincorporated community in Skagit County, Washington. It is located near the towns of Bay View, Edison, Burlington, and Mount Vernon. Bow is included in the Mount Vernon-Anacortes, Washington Metropolitan Statistical Area.  Bow overlooks Samish Bay. The population of Bow is 203 in the 2020 census.

The  narrow gauge Bow Hill Railroad, complete with a working steam locomotive, is located in the Bow area.  It can be found on the private property of Diz Schimke, who allows the public to ride the train during Christmastime in exchange for donations to the Alger food bank.

History
Bow was originally known as Brownsville, after William J. Brown, who homesteaded the townsite in 1869. The advent of the railroad resulted in a population boom and the need for a post office. Apparently inspired by the growth brought by the railroad, Brown suggested the new name of Bow, after the large railway station in London, England, which in turn was named for the bow or poplar tree. Although this is the most common belief, there are some who believe it was named after homesteader James T. Bow.

An alternate story claims that the settlement is named for a Norwegian immigrant family that settled in that area in the 1890s.  Their last name was Boe.

Geography and location
Bow is located in Skagit County, Washington, in the Mount Vernon-Anacortes metro area. It is located on Samish Bay, and is surrounded by dikes and contains part of a traditional flood plain.

References

External links

Bow information from Go Northwest website

Unincorporated communities in Washington (state)
Unincorporated communities in Skagit County, Washington